Heavy Liquid may refer to:
 Heavy liquid
 Heavy Liquid (album)
 Heavy Liquid (comics)